Harstad Camping is a campgrounds in the municipality of Harstad in Troms county, Norway.

External links
 Official website

Harstad
Campsites in Norway